Nethercleugh railway station was a station which served the rural area around Nethercleugh and the estate of Jardine Hall, 3 miles north of Lockerbie in Applegarth parish, Scottish county of Dumfries and Galloway. It was served by local trains on what is now known as the West Coast Main Line. The nearest station for Nethercleugh is now at Lockerbie.

History 
Opened by the Caledonian Railway, it became part of the London Midland and Scottish Railway during the Grouping of 1923 and was then closed by British Railways in 1960.

A mineral line ran down to the station from Corncockle Quarry, a large and historically important sandstone quarry near Templand. Stone from this quarry was used in Victorian times to build tenements in Edinburgh and Glasgow. Dinosaur footprints were found there in the 19th century.

The OS maps show that a saw mill was located near the station and was served by a siding, also extensive interchange sidings for quarry traffic were present.

The site today 
Trains pass at speed on the electrified West Coast Main Line. The station and platforms have been demolished and the station site is now part of a large sawmill site. A signal box controlled the level crossing on the minor road which have now been closed and the signal box demolished.

References

Notes

Sources 
 
 
 

Disused railway stations in Dumfries and Galloway
Railway stations in Great Britain opened in 1847
Railway stations in Great Britain closed in 1960
Former Caledonian Railway stations
1847 establishments in Scotland
1960 disestablishments in Scotland